Cri Cri is the third Italian television series starring Cristina D'Avena and Marco Bellavia, broadcast on Italy 1 between October 1990 and February 1991.

The show was aimed at audiences of various ages. Among the actors were also the future young musicians Massimo Varini, Eros Cristiani and Michele Monestiroli.

The show acts as a sequel to the show Cristina that, in turn, is the sequel to Arriva Cristina. Cri Cri is divided into two seasons: in the first, Cristina begins, together with Steve, Michele and Andrea (who will take the place of Marco) the internship in the clinic, while the second season will take place in the hospital with curious but very nice characters and in the meantime all the friends try to make money but end up putting us back until in the last episode everything is fixed for everyone.

Theme and soundtrack 
The theme song of the show is called Cri Cri, written by Carmelo "Ninni" Carucci and Alessandra Valeri Manera, and is sung by Cristina D'Avena herself. It is recorded as track 3 on the album Fivelandia 8. Within the series, before the final theme was held there were various sketches and commercials including The Thousand and a Fairytale, English junior and Exploring the Human Body....

His album Cri Cri was released, which contained all the songs interpreted in the series. In December 2010 the album was reissued for the first time on CD inside the box set Arriva Cristina Story, a 4-disc box containing the reissues of the soundtracks of the four Italian production shows inspired by the character of Cristina D'Avena.

The song "Merry Christmas" was also used on Channel 5 as the theme song for the song of the same name, which aired on December 24, 1990 and was conducted by Al Bano and Romina Power.

Episode Titles 

 Il tirocinio
 Un amico per tutti
 Vietato fumare
 Che pozione!
 Malata... o no?
 La supplente
 Gioco di mano...
 Prove generali
 La spia
 Venti d'amore
 Pentimento
 Lo scambio
 Generosità
 Ferie arretrate
 Tata, dove vai?
 Pizza per sempre
 Zio Carlo super prof.
 Il ritorno di Tata
 La posta del cuore
 Chi sarà?
 Ecologia e superstizione
 La fame vien mangiando
 Filippo e lo sport
 Piccole bugie
 A.A.A. Casa cercasi
 Luca, dove sei?
 Sembra facile
 Viva l'indipendenza
 Nostalgia
 Casa dolce casa
 L'impostore
 Le ziette
 Antonella, ti voglio bene
 Non vittima, ma eroe
 Tentazioni...
 Amici per sempre
 Cristina, cosa fai?
 Una balia per lo zio
 Di male in peggio
 Zio Carlo alla riscossa
 Tutti miliardari
 Quattro nuovi amici
 Luca e l'enciclopedia
 Il primo capello bianco
 E questo chi è?
 Alè oh oh
 Due ragazzine vanitose
 La lezione
 Ritorno alla natura
 Un disastro... alle erbe
 Fiori d'arancio
 Valeria e l'architetto
 Zio Carlo cresce
 Torna com'eri, zio!
 Tata apprendista inventore
 Lettere d'amore
 La televisione è bella
 Dov'è Cristina?
 Sembra facile...
 L'aggiustatutto
 Il primo batticuore
 Amore e bugie
 Per sempre...
 Una mamma in carriera
 Il trio comico
 Luci del varietà
 Cosa farò da grande?
 Le lumache
 Asso di cuori
 Formaggi a domicilio
 Un metodo infallibile
 Ciao a tutti!

See also
List of Italian television series

External links
 

Italian television series
Italia 1 original programming